Dave Allsop is a Scottish game designer and artist for role-playing games and video games.

Career
Dave Allsop developed the role-playing game SLA Industries (1993); the Scottish company Nightfall Games was founded solely to publish the game. Wizards of the Coast later bought SLA Industries, but then returned it to Nightfall, who licensed it to Hogshead Publishing; in 2002, Hogshead closed down and thus SLA Industries returned to Allsop. Allsop was by then the flatmate of Angus Abranson, and they decided to form a new role-playing company in 2003 called Cubicle 7 Entertainment. Allsop started work on a new release of SLA Industries, but in the Fall of 2004 Allsop decided to pull out of Cubicle 7 to pursue other opportunities. In 2005, Allsop, with Adrian Bott, produced The Book of Unremitting Horror, a book of monsters for the d20 System, published by Pelgrane Press. Allsop returned to Cubicle 7 in 2007 as the SLA Industries line editor, which started releasing new books again in 2011.

He is known for his work on the Magic: The Gathering collectible card game. He has also contributed art to the digital collectible card game Hearthstone.

His Dungeons & Dragons work includes interior art for Eberron Campaign Setting (2004), Monster Manual III (2004), Expedition to Castle Ravenloft (2006), Cityscape (2006), Fiendish Codex II: Tyrants of the Nine Hells (2006), Fantastic Locations: City of Peril (2007), Monster Manual V (2007), An Adventurer's Guide to Eberron (2008), the fourth edition Monster Manual (2008), the fourth edition Manual of the Planes (2008), Demon Queen's Enclave (2008), Draconomicon: Metallic Dragons (2009), and Martial Power II (2010).

Allsop was the concept artist for One Thumb Mobile, for their game Celtic Heroes, from 2012 to 2015. He returned to freelance work in February 2015.

References

External links

Living people
Place of birth missing (living people)
Role-playing game artists
Role-playing game designers
Year of birth missing (living people)